Qualification for gymnastics events at the 2012 Summer Olympics was based on the results of the three world gymnastics championships (rhythmic, artistic and trampoline) held in autumn 2011, and Olympic Test Events to be held in January 2012 at the North Greenwich Arena. In addition, the Fédération Internationale de Gymnastique and the IOC Tripartite Commission for Gymnastics allocated places to ensure certain minimum levels of representation.

Qualification timeline

Qualification summary
* Artistic gymnastics, NOCs with 5 entered athletes may also enter the team competition.

Artistic

Men

 * NOC may choose any gymnast
 ** NOC has choice between 2 gymnasts

Women

 * NOC may choose any gymnast
 ** NOC has choice between 2 gymnasts

Rhythmic

Individual

Group

 Great Britain as host is entitled to send a team to compete in the Rhythmic Gymnastics Group event, British Gymnastics and the British Olympic Association (BOA) announced that team would only be sent if the team achieved a benchmark score  at the test event. In the event, they narrowly failed to do so, and British Gymnastics announced it would not nominate the team to the BOA for inclusion. The GB Rhythmic Gymnastics group successfully appealed on 5 March 2012. The place offered by the BOA was subsequently taken up by British Gymnastics.

Trampoline

Men

Women

References

External links
Artistic Gymnastics World Championships Tokyo 2011
Rhythmic Gymnastics World Championships, Montpellier 2011
Trampoline and Tumbling World Championships, Birmingham 2011

Qualification
Qualification for the 2012 Summer Olympics